44th Street/Washington is a station on the Valley Metro Rail light rail line in Phoenix, Arizona, United States. The PHX Sky Train provides direct service from the light rail station to Phoenix Sky Harbor International Airport. Westbound trains in the morning depart from this station.

In addition to Valley Metro Bus service, two other companies service the station. Flixbus stops at the PHX Sky Train station. It is one of two stations for Flixbus service in the Phoenix area. Greyhound Lines's Phoenix - El Paso bus stops also stops at the station.

Ridership

Notable places nearby
 Pueblo Grande Museum
 Crowne Plaza Phoenix Airport
 Corporate headquarters for Desert Schools Federal Credit Union and Arizona Federal Credit Union
 COFCO Chinese Cultural Center, Phoenix

References

External links
 Valley Metro map

Valley Metro Rail stations in Phoenix, Arizona
Railway stations in the United States opened in 2008
2008 establishments in Arizona
Airport railway stations in the United States
Phoenix Sky Harbor International Airport